Mauricio Sanchez (born December 1973) is a Venezuelan actor.

Early life and education
Born and raised in Mérida, Venezuela, Sanchez is the son of local hoteliers Manuel and Rosarito Sanchez-Hernandez. He is the youngest of three brothers. When he was 17, Sanchez was an exchange student in Des Moines, Iowa.

After high school, Sanchez moved to Bowling Green, Kentucky to attend Western Kentucky University. He enrolled in WKU's Performing Arts Program, where he had the opportunity to study theatre, dance, music and acting.

Career
After graduating from college, Sanchez moved to New York City, where he was a performer at Cowboys La Cage. He performed in New York for several years in a variety of productions and national tours, including the national and international tours for West Side Story. He was cast for Center Stage in 2000 as a salsa dancer, his debut film work.

Sanchez later moved to Boston, Massachusetts to study performing for film and TV. Eighteen months later, with studies and independent film work behind him, he relocated to Los Angeles, where he enrolled in advanced acting classes and joined The Groundlings. He also made a short appearance in the movie Woo. Over the summer of 2005, he regularly auditioned for opportunities which led to his being cast for the comedy Date Movie. After his success in the role of Chamo on the VH1 series I Love New York, Sanchez appeared in the straight-to-DVD sequel Bachelor Party 2 in 2008.

Filmography

Film

Television

External links
Mauricio Sanchez, Actor - Website

1973 births
Living people
Venezuelan male film actors
Venezuelan male stage actors
Venezuelan male television actors